Charles F. Huot (born May 13, 1981) is a Montreal-based Canadian producer and songwriter best known by the stage name Dear Frederic.

The live band consists of drummer Julien Blais (Coeur de Pirate), multi-instrumentalist Danny Lutz and Huot singing and playing guitar and synth.

Debut EP

In April 2014, Huot released on Montreal based label Cult Nation his first EP, Outlast. The sound of these five tracks moves away from his former band Winter Gloves' pop-rock sound and explores the '80's synthpop era.

For his single "Outlast", the singer partnered up with musician and producer Tim Buron (Tork) and Husser (The Posterz) for a remix which is part of a Coke Zero advertisement: City of Possibilities. The ad aired on Mexican television and in a digital version on YouTube. Music from the EP was also used in Killjoys.

Beginning

Huot began his career as a singer and songwriter in 2008 with the Winter Gloves. Signed with Paper Bag Records in Toronto. The pop-rock group toured internationally with Huot at its lead.

The artist also created music that will be used in Canadian series such as Degrassi: The Next Generation, Tout sur moi, Castle, So You Think You Can Dance.

References

External links
 

Living people
Canadian male singers
Canadian pop musicians
Canadian singer-songwriters
French Quebecers
Musicians from Montreal
1981 births
Canadian male singer-songwriters